Tessella is a genus of moths in the family Erebidae. The genus was described by Breyer in 1957.

Species
 Tessella grandis Toulgoët, 2002
 Tessella jorgenseni Schaus, 1921
 Tessella klagesi (Rothschild, 1909)
 Tessella leucomelas Toulgoët, 2000
 Tessella sertata Berg, 1882

Former species
 Tessella apostata Schaus, 1905

References

Phaegopterina
Moth genera